Kuhdasht-e Sharqi Rural District is a rural district (dehestan) in the Central District of Miandorud County, Mazandaran Province, Iran. At the 2006 census, its population was 10,179, in 2,539 families. The rural district has 7 villages.

References 

Rural Districts of Mazandaran Province
Miandorud County